Sandrone Dazieri (born 4 November 1964) is a popular Italian crime writer. His most famous work is the Gorilla series, an episode of which was also dramatized as a television film.

Biography
He was born in Cremona in 1964. He graduated at San Pellegrino Terme hotel-management school and worked as a cook for ten years, all around Italy.
After having moved to Milan he started working in a number of jobs, from seller to porter, and played a very active role in the movement of Milan social centers.

In 1992 he got closer to publishing working as a proofreader for Telepress editorial service, and after five years he was appointed general manager of Milan branch. He also worked as a freelance journalist and collaborated with Manifesto as an expert of counterculture and genre fiction.

In 1999 he achieved his first popular success with the thriller Attenti al gorilla (Watch Out For The Gorilla), the first in a best-seller series, where the main character is a sort of doppelgänger of Dazieri himself, living the nightlife in Milan with all the ensuing troubles.
Dazieri's books are renowned for the rocambolesque adventures in which Sandrone (the main  character has the author's name too) is continuously involved, in an irrefrenable but never fatalistic destiny. It is in fact Sandrone's personality that always drives him to assist the weak and derelict, those who have lost all hope for help but for the Gorilla's saving hand. Among a thousand contradictions, he'll confront all sorts of dangers, in the best tradition of hardboiled thrillers, and aided by his alter ego called Socio (the rational side of Sandrone, in a split-personality condition), our hero will happily finalise and conclude many chilling and hair-raising situations.

He wrote two other noir novels (La cura del Gorilla Einaudi - Gorilla Blues Strade Blu Mondadori), a novel for kids (Disney Avventura), some scripts for comics (Pinocchio, Diabolik) and many short stories.

His last novels are: E' stato un attimo (Mondadori Strade Blu 2006, translated into English and published by Hersilia Press in 2012), Cemento Armato (ed. Mondadori 2007) and Bestie (VerdeNero edizioni ambiente 2007).

He is also a scriptwriter; among his films are La cura del Gorilla (from the same book) directed by Carlo A. Sigon and interpreted by Claudio Bisio, Un gioco da ragazze directed by Matteo Rovere and L'ultima Battuta, a TV movie.

With Italian film director Gabriele Salvatores and producer Maurizio Totti, Dazieri founded in 2004 the publishing house Colorado Noir.

From 2000 to 2004 he was also the chief editor of the crime series Gialli Mondadori (Mondadori Thrillers) and the catalogue for young readers Libri per Ragazzi Mondadori (Mondadori Books for Youth). He is currently a literary consultant to the Mondadori Publishing House.

Notes

Bibliography
Antologia cyberpunk (A Cyberpunk Anthology). 1994.
 Sandrone Dazieri (ed.) Italia Overground. Mappe e reti della cultura alternativa (Italy Overground. Maps & Networks of the Alternative Culture). Rome, Castelvecchi, 1996. .
 Sandrone Dazieri. Attenti al gorilla (Watch Out For The Gorilla). Milano, Mondadori, 1999. .
 Sandrone Dazieri. La cura del Gorilla (The Gorilla Cure). Turin, Einaudi, 2001. .
 Sandrone Dazieri. Gorilla blues. Milan, Mondadori, 2002. .
 Sandrone Dazieri. Ciak si indaga. Walt Disney Italy, 2003 (book for teens). .
 Sandrone Dazieri. Il Karma del gorilla (The Gorilla's Karma). Milan, Mondadori, 2005. .
 Sandrone Dazieri & Daniele G. Genova. La città buia (The Dark City). Aliberti, 2006. .
 Sandrone Dazieri. È stato un attimo (It Was But A Moment). Milan, Mondadori, 2006. .
 Sandrone Dazieri. Bestie (Beasts). Milan, Edizioni Ambiente (environmental series VerdeNero), 2007. .
 Sandrone Dazieri & Marco Martani. Cemento Armato (Reinforced Concrete). Milan, Mondadori, 2007. .
 Niccolo Ammaniti, Sandrone Dazieri, et al.. Crimini (Crimes). London, Bitter Lemon Press, 2008.  (Collection of crime stories, in English).
 Sandrone Dazieri. La Bellezza è un malinteso. Milan, Mondadori, 2010.
 Sandrone Dazieri. Uccidi il padre (Kill the Father). Milan, Mondadori, 2014.  
 Sandrone Dazieri. L'Angelo (English version: "Kill the Angel")  Milan, Mondadori, 2016. 
 Sandrone Dazieri. Il re di denari (English version: “Kill the King”)  Milan, Mondadori, 2018.

Screenwriting
La cura del Gorilla (The Gorilla Cure), directed by Carlo Arturo Sigon (2006)
L'ultima battuta (The Last Gag), TV movie for the series Crimini (Crimes) (2006)
Un gioco da ragazze (A Girls Play), directed by Matteo Rovere (2008)
La valle della paura (Valley of Fear),  (filming 2008-2009)
Bestie (Beasts), TV movie  (2009)
My name is Vendetta, Netflix (2022)

External links
Official website
Author's blog (Italian)

1964 births
Living people
21st-century Italian novelists
Italian crime fiction writers
Writers from Cremona
Italian screenwriters
Italian male novelists
21st-century Italian male writers
Italian male screenwriters
21st-century Italian screenwriters